In August 1944 (better known as The Moment of Truth) is a 2001 Russian-Belarusian action film directed by Mikhail Ptashuk.

Plot
A Soviet counter-intelligence (SMERSH) team are assigned to track down a group of German spies in Belarus following Operation Bagration as Soviet armies drive into Poland.

Cast 
 Yevgeny Mironov as Capt. Pavel Alekhin
 Vladislav Galkin as Senior Lt. Yevgeny Tamantsev
 Yuri Kolokolnikov as Lt. Blinov 
 Alexei Petrenko as General Yegorov
 Aleksandr Feklistov as Cipher Officer Polyakov
 Beata Tyszkiewicz as Grolinskaya
 Karolina Gruszka as Yuliya
 Ramaz Chkhikvadze as Stalin
 Aleksandr Baluev as Mishchenko
 Albert Filozov as Ivan Semyonovich
 Yaroslav Boyko as Captain Anikushin
 Vladimir Semago as lieutenant-colonel
 Alexei Makarov as Major-tanker

References

External links 

2001 films
2000s action war films
Russian action war films
Belarusian drama films
Eastern Front of World War II films
Belarusfilm films
Russian World War II films
Belarusian World War II films
2000s Russian-language films